Waldemar Pedrazzi (born 7 April 1955) is a Uruguayan former cyclist. He competed in the individual road race and team pursuit events at the 1976 Summer Olympics. He also won the Rutas de America in 1974.

References

External links
 

1955 births
Living people
Uruguayan male cyclists
Olympic cyclists of Uruguay
Cyclists at the 1976 Summer Olympics
Place of birth missing (living people)